Vegoritida is a former municipality in the Pella regional unit, Greece. Since the 2011 local government reform it is part of the municipality Edessa, of which it is a municipal unit. The municipal unit has an area of 289.987 km2. Population 3,635 (2011). The seat of the municipality was in Arnissa. The municipality was named after the Lake Vegoritida, and is situated on the northeastern shore of this lake.

References

Populated places in Pella (regional unit)
Edessa, Greece